The Quill  is a stratovolcano located on the island of Sint Eustatius in the Caribbean Netherlands. It is also the second highest mountain in the Netherlands.

The name 'Quill' originates from the Dutch term kuil, meaning 'pit' or 'hole', which was used originally with reference to the volcanic crater. The Quill was designated as a national park by the government of the Netherlands Antilles in 1998. It is administered by the Sint Eustatius National Parks Foundation, STENAPA, which maintains a number of trails for hikers.

The Quill formed between 22,000 and 32,000 years ago to the southeast of Sint Eustatius (Statia) in the West Indies. Pyroclastic flows during the initial eruption joined The Quill with what is now the rest of Sint Eustatius. The last known eruption, as determined by radiocarbon dating, occurred about 1,600 years ago.

Flora and fauna
The crater of The Quill contains a lush rainforest populated by native and introduced tropical trees and plants. These include elephant ears, tree ferns, begonias, figs, plantains, bananas, bromeliads, trumpet wood, mahogany, seedless breadfruit, Surinam cherry, ginger bush and edible raspberries, as well as at least 17 different kinds of orchids. Resident animal species include iguanas, anoles, snakes, Caribbean hermit crabs, butterflies, exotic birds, and occasional goats and chickens that have strayed from nearby Oranjestad.

See also
 List of volcanoes in the Netherlands

References

Landforms of Sint Eustatius
Volcanoes of the Caribbean
Holocene stratovolcanoes
Holocene North America
Natural history of Sint Eustatius
Volcanoes of the Netherlands